Anderson Michael Bonette Rodríguez (born 9 March 1998) is a Uruguayan footballer who plays as a midfielder for Rentistas in the Uruguayan Primera División.

Career

Rentistas
Bonette made his league debut for the club on 5 May 2019, playing the entirety of a 1-0 away victory over Central Español.

References

External links

1998 births
Living people
C.A. Rentistas players
Uruguayan Segunda División players
Uruguayan footballers
Association football midfielders